The Reide is a stream in the districts of Saalekreis and Halle (Saale) in the German state Saxony-Anhalt, Germany. It is a tributary of the White Elster, which it joins south of Halle.

See also
List of rivers of Saxony-Anhalt

Rivers of Saxony-Anhalt
Rivers of Germany